Hi Fly is a live jazz album by British saxophonist Peter King with the Philippe Briand Trio, recorded live at Le Plateau des Quatre Vent, Lorient, Brittany, France, by Daniel Duigou on 4 March 1984. It was King's fourth album on the Spotlite label.

Track listing
"Blues for S.J." (King) – 9:05
"Hi Fly" (Randy Weston) – 12:18
"Star Eyes" (Gene de Paul, Don Raye) – 8:10
"Old Folks" (Dedett Lee Hill, Willard Robison) – 8:08
"Seven Steps to Heaven" (Miles Davis, Victor Feldman) – 4:40

Personnel
Peter King – alto saxophone 
Pete Jacobsen – piano
Riccardo del Fra – bass
Philippe Briand – drums
Jakez Moreau – conga (on 2)

References

Peter King (saxophonist) albums
1984 live albums